Kaan is a masculine given name and surname of Turkic origin, meaning "ruler", "King of Kings" (Khagan).

Kaan is a popular name in Western Asia, mainly in Turkey and Northern Cyprus.

People with the surname Kaan
Demir Kaan, Turkish name of Damir Mršić (born 1970), basketball player from Bosnia and Herzegovina
 Fred Kaan, Anglo-Dutch clergyman and hymnwriter
Heinrich Kaan, 19th-century Russian physician
Mayo Kaan (1914–2002), American bodybuilder who claimed to be the original model for Superman

Fictional characters
Marty Kaan, the lead character in the Showtime comedy TV series House of Lies portrayed by Don Cheadle
Kaz Kaan, protagonist in the animated series Neo Yokio

People with the given name Kaan
Kaan Altan, Turkish rock guitarist
Kaan Ayhan, Turkish footballer
Kaan İnce (1970-1992), Turkish poet
Kaan Tayla (born 1986), Turkish swimmer
Kaan Üner, Turkish basketball player
Kaan Önder, Turkish racing driver
Kaan Tangöze, Turkish rock singer, writer and guitarist
Kaan Urgancıoğlu, Turkish actor

Fictional characters
 Kaan, young warrior, central character in video game Kaan: Barbarian's Blade
 Lord Kaan in the Star Wars Expanded Universe

See also

Caan (name) 
Kahn (name)
Khan (name)
Kaan (disambiguation) (other meanings)

Turkish-language surnames
Turkish masculine given names